Assfish may refer to:

 Bony-eared assfish, Acanthonus armatus
 Cavernous assfish, Porogadus gracilis, in the genus Porogadus
 Various species in the genus Bassozetus
 Robust assfish, Bassozetus robustus